Canadian National 1392 is a preserved 4-6-0 "ten-wheeler" type steam locomotive. It was built in 1913 by the Montreal Locomotive Works originally for the Canadian Northern Railway before it was absorbed into the Canadian National Railway. No. 1392 became famous in later years for pulling a plethora of small excursion trains throughout Western Canada. As of 2023, the locomotive is owned and operated by the Alberta Railway Museum and is based in Edmonton, Alberta.

History

Revenue service 
No. 1392 was constructed by the Montreal Locomotive Works in Montreal, Quebec in April 1913 as one of fifty-six H-6-g class 4-6-0 "ten-wheeler" type locomotives built for the Canadian Northern Railway (CNoR). The locomotive was initially assigned to pull passenger trains throughout the Canadian Province of Alberta. In 1918, the CNoR merged with the Canadian Government Railways (and later the Grand Trunk Railway) to form the Canadian National Railway (CN), and No. 1392 and its classmates were subsequently relettered under the CN flag. The locomotive was reassigned by CN to pull passengers and mixed freight trains throughout various parts of Central and Western Canada. As larger locomotives were added to the roster, No. 1392 was reassigned once more to pull trains on branch lines in Alberta and Saskatchewan. In October 1954, No. 1392 was converted to burn oil, as opposed to coal.  The locomotive was leased to the Northern Alberta Railway (NAR) on May 31, 1957, where it was reassigned to pull short-distance work trains and weed trains throughout Alberta. No. 1392 was retired from revenue service in June 1958, and it was thereafter donated to the City of Edmonton, who decided to move it to the Edmonton Exhibition grounds for static display.

Preservation 
During its time on static display, No. 1392 was meticulously maintained by members of the Canadian Railroad Historical Association (CRHA) Rocky Mountain Branch, in order to remain as clean and presentable to the general public as possible. In 1970, the locomotive was acquired by the recently-formed Alberta Pioneer Railway Association (APRA), and the locomotive was thereafter moved from the exhibition grounds to the Association's nearby location at the Edmonton Transit System (ETS) Cromdale Car Barn with the hopes of restoring it to operational status, and restoration work began in 1972. Work was completed in 1974, and No. 1392 was fired up and moved under its own steam for the first time under private ownership. The following year, 1975, the APRA relocated their equipment from the ETS car barn to a site that was part of CN's abandoned Coronado subdivision. The site was opened to the public two years later, with No. 1392 being one of the locomotives to be used to pull the museum's regular short-distance tourist trains.

The locomotive subsequently became one of the most popular attractions in the association's collection, and it was later joined by CN 4-8-2 "Mountain" type No. 6060. No. 1392 subsequently participated in several special events during its excursion career. During the 1986 World Exposition, No. 1392, along with No. 6060, was sent to Vancouver, British Columbia to take part in the Steam Expo '86 event, where a plethora of other steam locomotives also participated. Both locomotives returned to Edmonton, once the exposition was over. In 1993, the APRA, which by then changed its name to the Alberta Railway Museum (ARM), celebrated the 25th anniversary of its founding, and No. 1392 participated in the event. The locomotive also participated in the 35th anniversary in 2003.

In 2005, during the Centennial of Alberta becoming a Province, No. 1392 pulled a commemorative excursion train through Slave Lake, McLennan, Peace River, Edmonton, and Boyle. In 2013, the ARM celebrated No. 1392's 100th birthday. In 2017, several events were held to celebrate the Bicentennial of Canada, and the ARM celebrated by sending Numbers 1392 and 6060 to Alberta Prairie Railway Excursions' (APR) location in Stettler. In mid-June of that year, the No. 1392 and its tender were loaded on two separate flatbeds, and they were shipped by truck, before they were unloaded upon arrival in Stettler. Between June 28 and July 5, No. 1392 pulled commemorative trains between Stettler and Big Valley alongside the APR's own steam locomotive, 2-8-0 "Consolidation" No. 41 (formerly Mississippian No. 77), while No. 6060 was put on display. 

After the commemorations ended, Numbers 1392 and 6060 were both returned to Edmonton. In November 2017, No. 1392 was removed from service and disassembled in preparation for its mandated 5-year inspection. The locomotive passed the inspection with a minimal amount of components required to be replaced. It was thereafter reassembled and repainted, and in July 2018, it returned to service to pull the ARM's tourist trains. In late 2019, however, No. 1392 was removed from service once more, due to leaky tubes being discovered inside its boiler. As of 2023, No. 1392 is sitting out of service, waiting for some minor repairs in order to operate again.

Film history 
The No. 1392 locomotive has appeared in a few feature films and television shows since its return to service.

 No. 1392 was used to pull a freight train during filming of the 1978 drama film Days of Heaven, starring Richard Gere, Linda Manz, and Brooke Adams, and it was directed by Terrence Malick. The film won four awards after its release.
No. 1392 was seen pulling a short consist in the 1987 Western television film The Gunfighters, starring George Kennedy and Anthony Addabbo, and it was directed by Clay Borris.
No. 1392 was briefly filmed for the 1989 Independent film Bye Bye Blues, starring Rebecca Jenkins and Michael Ontkean, and it was directed by Anne Wheeler.
In 1996, No. 1392 was filmed while pulling a short passenger train for the CanWest Global television series Jake and the Kid, and it subsequently appeared in the 19th episode, What's Real, when it aired in June 1997. The series starred Benedict Campbell and Shaun Johnston, and it won a total of five awards.
In 2002, No. 1392 was decorated as a 19th century locomotive to appear in the 2003 Western television film Monte Walsh, starring Tom Selleck, Isabella Rossellini, and Keith Carradine, and it was directed by Simon Wincer.

See also 

 Canadian National 89
 Canadian National 1009
 Canadian National 3254
 Canadian National 7470
 Canadian Pacific 972
 Union Pacific 4466

References 

4-6-0 locomotives
Preserved steam locomotives of Canada
Individual locomotives of Canada
Standard gauge locomotives of Canada
Steam locomotives of Canada
1392
Canadian Northern Railway
MLW locomotives
Railway locomotives introduced in 1913